Akram Yari was a Maoist political organizer in Afghanistan. He was the leader and founder of the Progressive Youth Organization (PYO), a Marxist–Leninist organization which was formed on October 6, 1965.

Early years 
Akram Yari was born on 1940 in Jaghori, Ghazni Province, Afghanistan. He belonged to Hazara ethnic group. He received his early education in his hometown. Later he moved to Kabul where he received higher education. He was a teacher at Khushal Khan High School and later at Mehmood Tarzi High School.

Political activism 
Akram Yari was the founder and leader of Progressive Youth Organization (PYO), a Maoist organization, founded on October 6, 1965. PYO published a magazine called Shola-e-Jawid (Eternal Flame) which was circulated among students and youth.

Akram Yari opposed the monarchy of King Zahir Shah, the Islamic fundamentalists, and the pro-Soviet People's Democratic Party of Afghanistan (PDPA). PYO adhered to Marxism–Leninism–Mao Zedong thought, and rallied for the overthrow of the then-current order by means of civil war.

Influence 
Under Akram Yari's leadership, PYO had strong support among the masses of workers and students in the cities of Afghanistan. Among the people of Afghanistan, the movement that PYO led is famous by the name of Shola-e-Jawid and its members were commonly known as the Sholais (Flamists), after the name of their journal.

Akram Yari was a teacher and propagator of Marxism and introduced Marxism to a large number of intellectuals and political activists in Afghanistan, among them Dr. Faiz Ahmad, founder of Afghanistan Liberation Organization (ALO).

Arrest and assassination 
In 1978 the pro-Soviet PDPA came into power through a military coup. The PDPA government began a crack-down on PYO cadres. Akram Yari was arrested at his home in Jaghori, transferred to Kabul and later killed by the PDPA government. The exact conditions surrounding his death is not known.

See also 
 Progressive Youth Organization
 Shalleh-ye Javiyd
 List of Hazara people

References

External links 
 Akram Yari on bureaucratic capitalism
 Has Akram Yari founded the dialectical materialist approach of psychology?

Afghan communists
Anti-revisionists
Maoist theorists
Maoism in Afghanistan
1979 deaths
1940 births
Hazara politicians
Executed Afghan people
Executed communists
Executed revolutionaries
People from Ghazni Province
Maoists